Podium is a private technology company headquartered in Lehi, Utah that develops cloud-based software related to messaging, customer feedback, online reviews, selling products, and requesting payments.

History 
Podium was founded in 2014 by Eric Rea and Dennis Steele, who developed a tool to help small businesses "build their online reputation" through online reviews. Podium was initially known as RepDrive before rebranding as Podium in 2015. In 2015, Podium moved from a spare bedroom to a new location above a Provo bike shop. In March 2020, Podium added payments technology to its product suite. In November 2021, Podium raised $201 million in Series D funding and was valued at $3 billion.

Product 
Podium is a software-as-a-service platform designed to improve business online reputation. It helps users manage business interactions in one tool. Users can communicate reviews, texts, chats, and post payment directly within the app.

Awards and recognition 
 Podium was named one of the "Emerging Elite" by Mountain West Capital Network in 2016 and 2017.
 Podium's CEO Eric Rea was interviewed for "The Top" podcast in December 2016.
 Eric Rea was named one of the "highest rated CEOs" by Glassdoor in June 2017.
 Named the "No. 1 Startup to Watch" by Utah Valley Magazine in September 2017.
 Named Utah Business Medium Companies Best Companies to Work for in December 2017.
 Ranked 16th on Glassdoor's "Best Places to Work" list in 2018.
Ranked 13th on the 2018 Inc. 5000.
 Listed on Forbes' 2018 and 2021 "Cloud 100".
 Recognized by Forbes as one of their "Next Billion-Dollar Startups" .
 Ranked as the ninth fastest growing technology company, public or private, by Deloitte in 2018 
 Named by Fast Company as one of the "World's Most Innovative Companies" in 2019

References

External links 
 Official Website

American companies established in 2013
Companies based in Utah County, Utah
Y Combinator companies
Software
Collaborative software
Web applications
Companies based in Provo, Utah